Revealed is the collective name of a series of Australian documentaries and non-fiction investigative content produced by Stan, made in collaboration with the Nine Network. Each title prominently features the work of journalists and producers from Nine's other publications, including 60 Minutes, The Age, The Sydney Morning Herald, and the Australian Financial Review. The first title to release under the name was Revealed: Amongst Us – Neo Nazi Australia, which premiered on 27  March 2022. Further documentaries under the Revealed banner are scheduled for release in 2023.

 Documentaries 

 Amongst Us – Neo Nazi Australia
Hosted by investigative journalist Nick McKenzie and directed by documentarian Bentley Dean, Amongst Us – Neo Nazi Australia explores the inner-workings of extremist group National Socialist Network, and the rise of far-right terrorism in Australia. The documentary expands upon an initial special investigation produced by 60 Minutes, and was released on 27 March 2022.

 No Mercy, No Remorse
Developed under the working title of  The Prince of Hate, the second documentary in the series, No Mercy, No Remorse, investigates the life, crimes, and motives of Paul Denyer, an Australian serial killer who murdered three young women in the suburb of Frankston, Victoria in 1993. The documentary is directed by Terry Carlyon and presented by John Silvester, who also serves as senior crime reporter for The Age'' newspaper. It was developed with support from VicScreen and released on 23 June 2022.

References 

Stan (service) original programming
Australian television news shows